The City Hall (lit. "City Hall") is a 2009 South Korean television series starring Kim Sun-a and Cha Seung-won. It aired on SBS from April 29 to July 2, 2009 on Wednesdays and Thursdays at 21:55 for 20 episodes.

Written by Kim Eun-sook and directed by Shin Woo-chul, the story revolves around a low-ranking government clerk who becomes the youngest mayor of the fictional Inju City, and her romance with an ambitious and cynical deputy mayor.

Synopsis 
For the past seven years, Shin Mi-rae has been the lowest ranking public servant working in Inju City Hall. Her main job is to serve coffee to the high-ranking public officials. But when the prize money ends up in the corrupt mayor's pocket, Mi-rae holds a one-person demonstration in front of the city hall. After a series of ups and downs, Mi-rae gets her prize money, but has no choice but to resign from her job. After the beautiful but obnoxious councilwoman Min Joo-hwa mocks Mi-rae for losing her job at her bar, Mi-rae retaliates by denying her access to the toilet until she wets her skirt in front of journalists. When the situation is leaked to the press, the mayor resigns as well. The job of mayor is up for grabs and Mi-rae becomes nominated as a mayoral candidate. With the support of her followers and the backing of Jo Gook, the powerful deputy mayor, she becomes elected as the youngest mayor of Inju. With no political background but filled with the desire to genuinely work for her constituents, Mi-rae begins to reform the bureaucratic culture of the city hall administration. But in the process she butts heads with the cold-hearted and cool-headed Jo Gook, who had an ulterior motive in installing her and has presidential ambitions of his own.

Cast

Main 
Kim Sun-a as Shin Mi-rae
Cha Seung-won as Jo Gook
Chu Sang-mi as Min Joo-hwa
Lee Hyung-chul as Lee Jung-do
Yoon Se-ah as Go Go-hae

Supporting

Lee Joon-hyuk as Ha Soo-in
Jung Soo-young as Jung Boo-mi
Park Joo-ah as Yoo Kwon-ja, Shin Mi-rae's mother
Choi Il-hwa as BB
Cha Hwa-yeon as Jo Yong-hee, Jo Gook's mother
Kim Jin-sang as Jo Rang
Choi Sang-hoon as So Yoo-han
Yeom Dong-hwan as Mayor Go Boo-shil
Park Tae-kyung as Boo Jeong-han
Kwon Da-hyun as Bong Sun-hwa
Kang Joo-hyung as Mang Hae-ra
Yang Jae-sung as Kang Tae-gong
Kim Dong-gun as Park Ah-cheom
Shin Jung-geun as Director Ji
Choi Dae-sung as "Eraser"
Kim Ah-rang as "Run Honey"
Kim Neul-mae as "Rooftop Cat"
Moon Hee-soo as "Jessica Alba"
Chae Geon as young Jo Gook
Yoon Chae-rin as young Shin Mi-rae
Kim Gun as Yang
Min Joon-hyun as reporter Lee Jik-pil
Im Dae-il as Director Moon
Ryu Sung-han as Director Byun
Lee Jae-goo as Ye-san
Hong Ji-min as Madame Jung (ep. 15)
Kim Dong-gyun
Nam Hyun-joo
Kim Sung-oh

Soundtrack 
 다 잘 될 거야 	- Noh Young-shim
 그래 나를 믿자 (Okay, I'll Believe in Myself) - 	Jung-in feat. Bizzy
 불안한 사랑 (Uncertain Love) - Horan of Clazziquai
 미래's 왈츠 (Mi-rae's Waltz) - Noh Young-shim
 웃어봐 (Smile) - Chae Dong-ha of SG Wannabe
 Bright Funk - Noh Young-shim
 이사랑 부제; 이사랑 버리자 (This Love) - Position
 저무는 길 - Kim Jung-bae, Han Seol-hee
 희망찬 미래 - Noh Young-shim
 Tension - Noh Young-shim
 정치적 In 멜로디 - Noh Young-shim
 One Dream - Seo Moon-tak
 그럴 순 없어 - Noh Young-shim
 회기 불능 - Noh Young-shim
 다시 돌아갈 수 있을까 - Noh Young-shim
 저무는 길 Piano Ver. - Noh Young-shim
 캐슬 허슬 - Noh Young-shim
 종친다 	- Noh Young-shim
 그래 나를 믿자 Shuffle Ver. - Noh Young-shim
 Memory - Noh Young-shim
 사랑하고 사랑합니다 (Bonus Track) - Park Sang-woo of Bohemian

Ratings
In the table below, the blue numbers represent the lowest ratings and the red numbers represent the highest ratings.

Awards
2009 SBS Drama Awards
Excellence Award, Actor in a Drama Special: Cha Seung-won
Excellence Award, Actress in a Drama Special: Kim Sun-a
Top 10 Stars: Cha Seung-won, Kim Sun-a

International broadcast
 It aired in Vietnam on HTV3 from January 2, 2010, under the title Nữ Thị Trưởng.

References

External links 
The City Hall official SBS website 

City Hall at the Korea Tourism Organization

Seoul Broadcasting System television dramas
2009 South Korean television series debuts
2009 South Korean television series endings
Korean-language television shows
Television shows written by Kim Eun-sook
South Korean political television series
South Korean romantic comedy television series